Pope Lando (also known as Landus) was the bishop of Rome and the ruler of the Papal States from around September 913 to his death around March 914. His short pontificate fell during an obscure period in papal and Roman history, the so-called Saeculum obscurum (904–964).

According to the Liber pontificalis, Lando was born in the Sabina (Papal States), and his father was a wealthy Lombard count named Taino from Fornovo. The Liber also claims that his pontificate lasted only four months and twenty-two days. A different list of popes, appended to a continuation of the Liber pontificalis at the Abbey of Farfa and quoted by Gregory of Catino in his Chronicon Farfense in the twelfth century, gives Lando a pontificate of six months and twenty-six days. This is closer to the duration recorded by Flodoard of Reims, writing in the tenth century, of six months and ten days. The end of his pontificate can be dated to between 5 February 914, when he is mentioned in a document of Ravenna, and late March or early April, when his successor, John X, was elected.

Lando is thought to have been the candidate of Count Theophylact I of Tusculum and Senatrix Theodora, who were the most powerful couple in Rome at the time. The Theophylacti controlled papal finances through their monopoly of the office of vestararius, and also controlled the Roman militia and Senate. During Lando's reign, Arab raiders, operating from their stronghold on the Garigliano river, destroyed the cathedral of San Salvatore in Vescovio in his native diocese. No document of Lando's chancery has survived. The only act of his reign that is recorded is a donation to the diocese of Sabina mentioned in a judicial act of 1431. Lando made the large personal gift in order to restore the cathedral of San Salvatore so that the clergy who were then living at Toffia could return.

Notes

References

External links

Catholic Forum: Pope Lando
New Catholic Dictionary: Pope Lando

Popes
Italian popes
People from Lazio
914 deaths
Year of birth unknown
10th-century popes
Burials at St. Peter's Basilica